"Go Crazy" is a song by American singer-songwriter Chris Brown and American rapper Young Thug, from their collaborative mixtape Slime & B, released on May 5, 2020. After it became the only charting song from the mixtape, it was officially released as a single on May 19, 2020. The song is a trap-infused R&B record, with production that samples the Showboys's 1986 single "Drag Rap", for which the Showboys are credited as writers. The official remix of the song was released on February 19, 2021, and features fellow American rappers Future, Lil Durk, and Latto.

"Go Crazy" garnered positive reviews from music critics, who complimented its production and the duo's delivery, being considered by some as the mixtape's best song. Some critics compared the song to early 2010s music, as well as Brown's previous single "Heat" (2019), for its similar musical direction. The song received great success, becoming Brown's biggest radio hit since 2008, dominating on both pop and hip hop radio, breaking the record for most weeks at number one on the R&B/Hip-Hop Airplay chart, surpassing "No Guidance", by Brown (ft. Drake). The song peaked at number three on the Billboard Hot 100 in 2021, earning Brown his seventh top-five song as a lead artist, as well Young Thug's highest lead artist charting song in the US.

A music video, shot in Brown's California mansion, was released on July 17, 2020, and displays a big house party, with a supernatural atmosphere full of colorful thunders, fireworks, pools and girls. The storyline of the videoclip continues in the music video of the following single from the mixtape, "Say You Love Me". "Go Crazy" received various accolades, including one iHeartRadio Music Award and three Soul Train Music Awards, including Song of the Year.

Background and composition
Brown and Thug previously collaborated on the official remix of Brown's song "Wrist", contained in OHB and Brown's collaborative mixtape Before the Trap: Nights in Tarzana, on the free-released track "Dat Night", and on "High End", a promotional single from Brown's acclaimed eighth studio album Heartbreak on a Full Moon. "Go Crazy" first appeared as track 2 on Brown's and Thug's collaborative mixtape Slime & B on May 5, 2020. The song performed particularly well on streaming services and was subsequently sent to radio as a single. Two weeks later, Brown and his daughter Royalty started a dance challenge for the song called "#GoCrazyChallenge". The challenge sees a person dancing on the sidewalk outside a slow moving car. According to Brown, the challenge was inspired by influencer Mufasa.

"Go Crazy" is a harmonic uptempo, trap-infused, R&B song. The song's production samples "Drag Rap" (1986) by the Showboys, a song that was also sampled by Brown for the song "Emerald" contained in his ninth studio album Indigo. Lyrically, it sees Brown and Thug guarantee to a debaucherous girl, whose appearance looks shy, their fun and expensive lifestyle. The song is in the key of C minor with a tempo of 94 BPM with a time signature of 4/4 in common time.

Critical reception

"Go Crazy" obtained critical acclaim, with various critics naming it as a standout from Slime & B, particularly commending Brown for his "perfectly harmonized" hook. XXL listed it among the best hip hop songs of the year. Carl Lamare of Billboard said that the song "is mandatorily catchy. CB has very few misses in his catalog when it comes to penning sing-songy hooks, and he accomplished that same mission when whipping up 'Go Crazy'. Thug plays the perfect partner, too, matching his melodic intensity with an action-packed verse of his own".

Complex named it the 24th best song of 2020, with the magazine's Jessica McKinney calling it "an underrated banger", opining that the "late-night record [...] will likely make it to summer playlists in the years to come". Kenan Draughorne of HipHopDX called "Go Crazy" "the album's best song, cleverly sampling The Showboys' iconic 'Drag Rap' to complement the free-ranging sonics". HipHopDX also named it one of the best R&B songs of 2020, writing: "Go Crazy' is 2010s kid's dream song. From Breezy's signature sweet falsetto coupled with Thugger's squeaking slime language, to the sample of The Show Boys' 'Drag Rap' (also found in T.I. and Lil Wayne's 'Ball'), 'Go Crazy' is a time capsule track catering to the strengths of two of the most renowned hitmakers of the last decade".

Music video
The official video was released on July 17, 2020. It was directed by Brown, Mat Fuller and production company Paradise City Entertainment. It was shot at Brown's Southern California home, where the song was also recorded, during the first COVID-19 quarantine. Diddy's sons Justin and Christian make "high-energy" cameos in the visual, while Gunna also makes an appearance. HipHopDXs Marisa Mendez defined the videoclip as "colorful", noting, as is signature to Brown, that the video comes complete with "dope" choreography.

Synopsis 
The clip shows the two artists waking up at a big, wild house party, as the atendees put their lavish lifestyles on display. It continues with them performing numerous dance choreographies, ending up chasing two mysterious girls who, at the end of the clip, rarefy themselves in colored clouds, inviting Brown and Thug to enter, and the duo, being intrigued, follows them. Throughout the video there are numerous features that make the party's atmosphere look at times supernatural, including colorful thunders. The story of the video clip continues in the music video of the following single from the mixtape, "Say You Love Me".

Chart performance
"Go Crazy" reached number five on the US Billboard Hot 100 chart on the week of January 16, 2021. This was the lengthiest ascent to the top five (35 weeks) for a song by lead males in the Hot 100's 62-year history, and third overall behind Gabby Barrett's "I Hope", featuring Charlie Puth (45 weeks, 2020), and Imagine Dragons' "Radioactive" (42 weeks, 2012-2013). It marked Brown's 16th top ten song and Young Thug's fourth top ten on the chart. The track later peaked at number three on the chart in March 2021. The song ended up spending more than one full year on the chart, becoming both artists's first song to do so. On the Hot R&B/Hip Hop Songs chart, it became Brown's sixth number-one in its 32nd week in December 2020, tying for the third-longest ascent to the top since the chart's inception. The song became Brown's biggest radio hit since 2008's "Forever", reaching number one on the all-genre Radio Songs chart where it stayed atop for over six consecutive weeks. It peaked at number one on the US Rhythmic Songs, making it Brown's twelfth number one song on the chart, and Thug's third number one song. It later broke the record for the longest stay in the top 10 of the Rhythmic chart, after it logged a 32nd week on the chart dated February 6, 2021. The song topped the R&B/Hip-Hop Airplay chart as well, on the week of August 22, 2020, with 22.6 million in audience in the week ending August 16, making it Brown's ninth number-one song on the chart, and Young Thug's fourth number-one. It also became Brown's 50th top 10 hit on the chart.  
In the United Kingdom, the song peaked at number ten on the UK Singles Chart. It served as Brown's 18th top ten song and Thug's third top ten on the chart

Accolades

Live performances 
The song was performed for the first time by Brown more than one year following its release, on September 24, 2021, at Staples Center, in Los Angeles, during an appearance for Lil Baby's Back Outside Tour. The singer then performed "Go Crazy" in London, during an appearance for Wizkid's Made in Lagos tour, marking his first performance in the UK in 11 years, following the revocation of his ban from entering the country implemented in 2010.

Track listing
Digital download and stream
"Go Crazy" – 2:59
Digital download and stream
"Go Crazy" (Remix)  – 3:49

Personnel
Credits adapted from Tidal.

 Chris Brown – lead artist, songwriting, composition
 Young Thug – lead artist, songwriting, composition
 Cameron Devaun Murphy – composition, production
 Kaniel Castaneda – composition, production
 Orville Hall – songwriting, composition
 Patrizio Pigliapoco – composition, mixing engineering, recording engineering
 Phillip Price – songwriting, composition
 Tre Samuels – songwriting, composition
 Turrell Sims – songwriting, composition
 Mike Tucci – master engineering
 A. "Bainz" Bains – mixing engineering, recording engineering
 Aresh Banaji – mixing engineering

Charts

Weekly charts

Year-end charts

Certifications

Remix

The official remix was released on February 19, 2021, and features American rappers Future, Lil Durk, and Latto (then known as Mulatto). It was announced by Brown and Thug on February 16, 2021, along with a cartoon cover art featuring all five artists. The remix's theme was centered around "bringing back the summer tune" that makes one forget about 2020. Much like the original, it finds the rappers harmonizing about love and sex, with Durk and Future delivering "melodic" verses, in between the "relaxed" raps of Latto.

Critical reception
Andrew Unterberger of Billboard said about the remix, "Honestly, no matter who's delivering the verses to this song, memory of them vanishes almost completely by the time that massive chorus rolls around again. The remix is fine, and some programmers will undoubtedly be grateful for the fresh alternative, but ultimately I doubt its impact will be lasting".

Charts

Release history

References

2020 songs
2020 singles
2021 singles
Chris Brown songs
Songs written by Chris Brown
Young Thug songs
Songs written by Young Thug
Future (rapper) songs
Songs written by Future (rapper)
Latto songs
Lil Durk songs
Songs written by Latto
RCA Records singles